Tell al-Wilayah is an archaeological site in the Wasit Governorate of eastern  Iraq. The site has now been completely destroyed by large scale looting. It is located around 20 km southwest of the modern city of Kut and 6 kilometers southwest of Tulul al-Baqarat.

History
The site is dated to the Akkadian and Ur III periods. It has been suggested as the location of Kesh (Sumer), now thought to be at Tulul al-Baqarat. It has also been proposed as the site of Irisaĝrig.

Archaeology
There were two mounds. Tell al-Wilayah I covered 64 hectares with a height of 5 meters. Tell al-Wilayah II covered about 4.5 hectares and rose to about 5 meters above the plain.

Iraqi archaeologists worked the site in 1958. Sixteen degraded whole and partial cuneiform tablets of the Old Akkadian and Ur II periods were found in robber holes, discarded by looters. Also found were two Old Akkadian clay jar sealings, and ivory figurine and two Ur III bricks, of Shu-Shin and Shulgi. A palace was found  at the northwest corner of the mound, constructed with plano-convex bricks. In response to major looting, the Iraqi State Board of Antiquities and Heritage conducted excavations in 1999 and 2000. Five Old Akadian cuneiform tablets were found.

References

See also
Cities of the ancient Near East
Tulul al-Baqarat

Archaeological sites in Iraq
Ancient cities of the Middle East